Lasionycta skraelingia is a moth of the family Noctuidae. It has a Holarctic distribution, occurring from Scandinavia to north-western North America. In North America this species is known from three specimens from Windy Pass, Ogilvie Mountains, Yukon.

The wingspan is about 31 mm. Adults are on wing from late June to early July. In Eurasia, the species is biennial. This is likely also the case in North America. The Yukon specimens were collected in two odd-numbered years.

In Scandinavia the species is polyphagous when reared and has been fed on Betula nana, Polygonum aviculare and Vaccinium uligonosum.

External links
A Revision of Lasionycta Aurivillius (Lepidoptera, Noctuidae) for North America and notes on Eurasian species, with descriptions of 17 new species, 6 new subspecies, a new genus, and two new species of Tricholita Grote
Records from Finland

Lasionycta
Moths of Japan
Moths of North America
Moths of Europe
Moths described in 1852